Psychopathic Records is an American independent record label based in Farmington Hills, Michigan that specializes in hip hop music. Owned by Insane Clown Posse members Joseph Bruce and Joseph Utsler, the label was founded by the group and their manager Alex Abbiss in 1991. Then known as Inner City Posse, the group released the label's first album, Dog Beats, that year. Since its foundation, the label has featured 23 artists and bands from the United States, predominantly around Detroit, Michigan.

Two now defunct subsidiary labels, Ax & Smash Records and Urban Music Zone, were created under Psychopathic Records. In 2007, Psychopathic founded its third subsidiary label, Hatchet House.

Album releases

Upcoming album releases

See also
 List of films released by Psychopathic Video

References
General

 
 
 
 
 
 
 
 
 
 
 
 
 
 

Specific

External links
 Psychopathic Records' official website
 

 
Discographies of American record labels
Hip hop discographies